Mohammad al-Hussein is a Syrian economist and politician who is a member of the Ba'ath Party. He served in different cabinet positions.

Education
Hussein holds a PhD in economy, which he received from a university in Romania.

Career
Hussein started his career in the public sector and worked for a long time there. He also served as an economy professor at Aleppo University. Then he became a member of the Baath Party's ruling regional command. In addition, he served as the head of the party's committee of economic affairs. In 2000, he became a member of the party's central committee.

On 13 December 2001, Hussein was appointed deputy prime minister for economic affairs in the cabinet headed by then prime minister Mohammad Mustafa Mero. Hussein replaced Khalid Raad as deputy prime minister. Hussein's term lasted until 2003. In September 2003, he was appointed finance minister, replacing Mohammad Al Atrash. The cabinet, formed on 18 September 2003, was headed by then prime minister Mohammad Naji Al Otari. Hussein retained his post in the cabinet reshuffles of 2006 and 2009. However, his tenure ended in 2011.

References

Living people
Members of the Regional Command of the Arab Socialist Ba'ath Party – Syria Region
20th-century Syrian economists
Academic staff of the University of Aleppo
Syrian ministers of finance
Deputy Prime Ministers of Syria
Year of birth missing (living people)
21st-century Syrian economists